Xhynejt Çutra (born 23 November 1988) is an Albanian football player who currently plays for Erzeni Shijak in the Albanian First Division. He went on trial with Dinamo Zagreb in January 2008 but was subsequently not offered a contract.

References

1988 births
Living people
Footballers from Tirana
Albanian footballers
Association football midfielders
Kategoria Superiore players
KS Pogradeci players
NK Olimpija Ljubljana (2005) players
NK Radomlje players
KF Apolonia Fier players
KS Shkumbini Peqin players
Besëlidhja Lezhë players
KF Gramshi players
KF Bylis Ballsh players
KF Tërbuni Pukë players
FK Dinamo Tirana players
KS Kastrioti players
KS Turbina Cërrik players
KF Erzeni players
KF Korabi Peshkopi players
Albanian expatriate footballers
Expatriate footballers in Slovenia
Albanian expatriate sportspeople in Slovenia